The 1877 Maine gubernatorial election was held on September 10, 1877. Incumbent Republican Governor Seldon Connor defeated Democratic nominee and former governor Joseph H. Williams and Greenback nominee Henry C. Munson.

General election

Candidates

Republican 

 Seldon Connor

Democratic 

 Joseph H. Williams

Greenback 

 Henry C. Munson

Results

References 

Gubernatorial
Maine
Maine gubernatorial elections